The 2012 Formula 3 Sudamericana season was the 26th Formula 3 Sudamericana season. It began on 22 July 2012, at Autódromo Internacional de Curitiba, and ended on 2 December on the same circuit. After a year more complicated of the category, Formula 3 Sudamericana becomes organized by Vicar, the same of Stock Car Brasil and Brasileiro de Marcas.

After winning the light class in 2010, Fernando Resende won the main class, the fourth successive title of Césario Fórmula team. On the light class Césario Fórmula driver Higor Hoffman won the championship. The 2012 season was marked by only three drivers racing in all rounds and with no driver and race outside Brazil.

Drivers and teams
 All cars were powered by Berta engines, and ran on Pirelli tyres. All drivers were Brazilian registered.

Race calendar and results
All rounds were held in Brazil.

Championship standings
Points were awarded as follows:

Drivers' Championship

Notes:
† — Driver did not race and did not score points for participating with partner.

References

External links
 The official website of the Formula Three Sudamericana

Formula 3 Sudamericana
Sudamericana
Formula 3 Sudamericana seasons
Sudamericana F3